Princess Elizabeth Grigorievna Temkina (– ) was the alleged daughter of Catherine the Great and Grigory Potemkin.

Biography
According to a number of historical testimonies and family legends, which, however, do not have documentary evidence and are disputed by most historians, Grigory Potemkin and Catherine the Great were secretly married. In 1775, a female infant appeared in Potemkin's house, who was named Elizabeth Grigorievna Temkina (the surname was obtained by truncation from “Potemkin”). The girl was born secretly, but at the court there were rumors that the empress was her mother, though this is now regarded as unlikely. Elizabeth was brought up in the Samoilov household, and was never acknowledged by Catherine.

References

Sources
 

1775 births
1854 deaths
18th-century people from the Russian Empire
19th-century people from the Russian Empire
18th-century women from the Russian Empire
19th-century women from the Russian Empire
People from the Russian Empire
Potemkin family
Children of Catherine the Great
Illegitimate children of Russian monarchs